is a biographical television drama series that aired on Fuji TV.

Cast
 Kurara Emi as Chōchō Miyako
 Yuko Asano as Saki Hyuga
 Kana Miura as Miss Wakana
 Satoshi Jinbo as Ryushi Sanyutei
 Yumi Takigawa as Hana Saito
 Kazuma Sano as Haruo 
 Kazuko Kato as Sei Yoshimura 
 Tsurutaro Kataoka as Eijiro Hyuga
 Mitsuho Otani as Natsuko
 Takayuki Godai as Hanamaru

References

External links
 Suzuko no Koi at THK 

Fuji TV dramas
2012 Japanese television series debuts
Japanese drama television series
Television series based on actual events